Peter Wirnsberger II, so called to distinguish him from the just homonymous Peter Wirnsberger (born 13 September 1958) is an Austrian former alpine skier.

World Cup results
Top 10

References

External links
 

1968 births
Living people
Austrian male alpine skiers